Richard Hallebeek (born August 2, 1974 in Bilthoven) is a Dutch jazz fusion guitarist.

Discography

Further contributions of Richard Hallebeek on the albums The Alchemists (track nr 5), Perception Of The Beholder from Isotope, and Attitude from Salvatore Vecchio & Simone Damiani. 2013: Richard Hallebeek Project II: Pain in the Jazz

External links
Richard Hallebeek Website

Living people
Dutch jazz guitarists
Dutch male guitarists
People from De Bilt
Male jazz musicians
1974 births